Nao Hibino was the defending champion, but chose not to participate.

Usue Maitane Arconada won the title, defeating Nicole Gibbs in the final, 6–0, 6–2.

Seeds

Draw

Finals

Top half

Bottom half

References

Main Draw

2019 ITF Women's World Tennis Tour
2019 Singles